Ron Ben-Israel is an Israeli-American pastry chef. He is the executive chef and owner of Ron Ben-Israel Cakes in New York City. He is known for his wedding and special occasion cakes as well as for his detail in sugar paste flowers. From 2011 to 2013, he hosted the cooking competition TV show Sweet Genius.  Ben-Israel has also been a judge on a variety of Food Network shows, including Cake Wars, Chopped, Guy's Grocery Games and Worst Cooks in America.

Biography 
Ron Ben-Israel was born in Israel. His mother was born in Vienna and was rescued from the ghetto by American volunteers, later immigrating to Israel. His father, Moshe, lost most of his family in the Holocaust, and survived Auschwitz. His father worked in the printing industry, while his mother worked in map-making for the government.

Ben-Israel grew up in Tel Aviv. He loved baking in the kitchen as a child. He attended the Thelma Yellin High School for the Arts, specializing in dance. Ben-Israel is gay.

Dancing career 
Ben-Israel started a dance career at age 21, right after discharging from the army. He specialized in modern dance. He danced with the Israeli dance companies Batsheva and Bat-Dor over a period of some 15 years, and toured internationally. Near the end of his dancing career, he moved to the United States.

Baking career 
In 1993, while living in New York City, Ben-Israel retired from dancing, in part due to having developed arthritis. He started a new career in cooking, doing temporary jobs making cakes and designing shop windows. In 1996, he fell in love with baking. He was discovered and mentored by Betty Van Nostrand and Martha Stewart who saw one of his cakes in a window.

Ben-Israel's confectionery pieces have been featured at the openings of the Mandarin Oriental, New York and The Ritz-Carlton and are part of events at other New York hotels including the St. Regis, the Pierre, and the New York Palace. Modern Bride, Town & Country, Martha Stewart Weddings, InStyle, The New York Times, and Vogue have commissioned his cake designs. His television appearances include Martha Stewart, the Bravo Network, The Oprah Winfrey Show, the Food Network, and the Late Show with David Letterman.

From 2011 to 2013, Ben-Israel was the host and judge of the Food Network competition show Sweet Genius.

Ben-Israel is a Visiting Master Pastry-Instructor at The International Culinary Center in New York City.  He teaches the Classic Pastry Arts class and the Cake Techniques & Design class his approach to sugar paste.

Ben-Israel appeared as a guest judge on Season 2 of the Netflix Baking-parody show Nailed It!. He has also appeared as a guest judge on Season 3 of Netflix's Sugar Rush and on Food Network's The Big Bake.

References

External links
 

Pastry chefs
Food Network chefs
Living people
Israeli television chefs
American male chefs
American television chefs
Chefs from New York City
Israeli LGBT entertainers
21st-century Israeli Jews
Gay Jews
Gay entertainers
Israeli gay men
Israeli emigrants to the United States
Israeli people of Austrian-Jewish descent
Israeli soldiers
Israeli male dancers
Modern dancers
Gay dancers
1957 births
Jewish American chefs
21st-century American Jews
LGBT chefs